John Cridland Latham (March 3, 1888 – November 5, 1975) was a United States Army soldier who received the U.S. military's highest decoration, the Medal of Honor, for his actions in World War I.

Born on March 3, 1888, in Windermere, England, Latham immigrated to the United States and joined the Army from Rutherford, New Jersey. By September 29, 1918, he was serving as a sergeant in Machine Gun Company, 107th Infantry Regiment, 27th Division. On that day, near Le Catelet in northeastern France, he and two other soldiers, Sergeant Alan L. Eggers and Corporal Thomas E. O'Shea, left cover to rescue the crew of a disabled American tank. O'Shea was killed in the process, but Latham and Eggers successfully defended the wounded tank crewmen from German fire all day and carried them to the safety of the Allied lines after nightfall. For this action, all three soldiers were awarded the Medal of Honor the next year.

Medal of Honor Citation
Rank and organization: Sergeant, United States Army, Machine Gun Company, 107th Infantry, 27th Division.
Place and date: At Le Catelet, France, September 29, 1918.
Entered service at: Rutherford, New Jersey
Birth:  Windermere, England
General Orders: War Department, General Orders No. 20 (January 30, 1919).

Citation:

Becoming separated from their platoon by a smoke barrage, Sergeant Latham, Sergeant Alan L. Eggers, and Corporal Thomas E. O'Shea took cover in a shell hole well within the enemy's lines. Upon hearing a call for help from an American tank which had become disabled 30 yards from them, the three soldiers left their shelter and started toward the tank under heavy fire from German machineguns and trench mortars. In crossing the fire-swept area, Corporal O'Shea was mortally wounded, but his companions, undeterred, proceeded to the tank, rescued a wounded officer, and assisted two wounded soldiers to cover in the sap of a nearby trench. Sergeants Latham and Eggers then returned to the tank in the face of the violent fire, dismounted a Hotchkiss gun, and took it back to where the wounded men were keeping off the enemy all day by effective use of the gun and later bringing it with the wounded men back to our lines under cover of darkness.

Military Awards 
Latham's military decorations and awards include:

See also

List of Medal of Honor recipients for World War I

Footnotes

1888 births
1975 deaths
English emigrants to the United States
People from Rutherford, New Jersey
United States Army soldiers
United States Army personnel of World War I
United States Army Medal of Honor recipients
English-born Medal of Honor recipients
Burials at Arlington National Cemetery
World War I recipients of the Medal of Honor
Recipients of the Distinguished Conduct Medal
Military personnel from Cumberland